Jolie & the Wanted the only album released country music group Jolie & the Wanted. It was released on June 26, 2001 via DreamWorks Nashville and was produced by Mark Bright and Dann Huff.

Released from the album were the singles "I Would", "Boom", "(When I Look in Your Eyes) I'm Beautiful", and "Party on the Patio". However, only the first two singles charted, where they both reached number 55 on the Billboard Hot Country Songs chart.

Bret Love of Allmusic gave the album two stars out of five, saying that Jolie's "sound has all the indicators of a pre-fabricated pop star[…]It's all fine if you're into that sort of thing, but the album is completely lacking in soul."

Track listing
 "Boom" (John Rotch, Shara Johnson) - 3:12
 "I Would" (Brett James, Troy Verges) - 3:58
 "Let It Go" (Stephony Smith, Jason Sellers) - 4:02
 "I'm Beautiful" (Greg Barnhill, Holly Lamar, Jolie Edwards) - 4:21
 "The Wantin' Not the Gettin'" (Al Anderson, Bob DiPiero, Jeffrey Steele) - 4:10
 "Party on the Patio" (Craig Wiseman, Steele) - 4:55
 "Wasted" (Anderson, Steele) - 3:54
 "It's Only Love" (Bekka Bramlett, Steele) - 3:33
 "You Make Me Feel Like a Woman" (Chris Lindsey, Aimee Mayo) - 3:35
 "You Make Me" (Roxie Dean, Jamie O'Neal, Daryl Burgess) - 3:18
 "I Go Crazy" (Paul Davis) - 4:21

Personnel
Tim Akers - keyboards
Steve Brewster - drums
Lisa Cochran - background vocals
Eric Darken - percussion
Jolie Edwards - lead vocals
Paul Franklin - dobro, steel guitar
Dann Huff - acoustic guitar, electric guitar
Kirk "Jelly Roll" Johnson - harmonica
Gordon Kennedy - electric guitar
Chris McHugh - drums
Jerry McPherson - electric guitar
Gene Miller - background vocals
Michael Rhodes - bass guitar
Jackie Street - bass guitar
Biff Watson - acoustic guitar
John Willis - acoustic guitar
Jonathan Yudkin - fiddle, mandolin

References

Jolie & the Wanted albums
Albums produced by Dann Huff
2001 albums